Hayden Kai Muller (born 7 February 2002) is an English footballer who plays for League of Ireland Premier Division club Dundalk.

Career
Muller made his professional debut for Millwall on the final day of the 2019–20 season in a 4–1 victory against Huddersfield Town. He signed a new contract with the club in June 2021.

On 30 June 2021, Muller joined Scottish Premiership side St Johnstone on a season-long loan deal. He was recalled by Millwall in January 2022.

On 13 January 2023, Muller signed a multi-year contract with League of Ireland Premier Division club Dundalk.

Career statistics

References

2002 births
Living people
English footballers
Association football midfielders
Millwall F.C. players
St Johnstone F.C. players
Dundalk F.C. players
English Football League players
Scottish Professional Football League players
League of Ireland players
Expatriate association footballers in Ireland
Expatriate association footballers in the Republic of Ireland